The Order of Glory (Nichani-Iftihar) was the second highest-ranking chivalric order of the Ottoman Empire, and was founded on 19 August 1831 by Sultan Mahmud II. 

The Order of Glory was not made obsolete by the institution of the Order of the Medjidie in 1851, but continued to be awarded during the reign of Abdul Hamid II. 

A chapter of the Ottoman Order of Glory was instituted in Tunisia in 1835 as the Order of Glory (Tunisia) by Mustafa ibn Mahmud, the Bey of Tunis.

Recipients 

 Grand Cordons
Charles-Marie-Esprit Espinasse
 Andrew Cunningham, 1st Viscount Cunningham of Hyndhope
 Prince Georg of Bavaria
 Marie-Pierre Kœnig
 Jagatjit Singh
 Walter Bedell Smith
 Shah Jahan Begum
 Jan Syrový
 Arthur Tedder, 1st Baron Tedder
 Grand Officers
 Pierre Clostermann
 Henri Romans-Petit
 Washington Carroll Tevis
 Commanders
 Pierre Billotte
 Prince Leopold of Bavaria
 Samuel Morse
 Kazimierz Porębski
 Bernard Saint-Hillier
 Bib Dod Pasha
 Knights
 Prince Adalbert of Prussia (1884–1948)
 Alois Lexa von Aehrenthal
 Constantin Cantacuzino (died 1877)
 Prince Eitel Friedrich of Prussia
 Wilhelm II, German Emperor
 Unknown Class
Horatio Nelson, 1st Viscount Nelson
Horace François Bastien Sébastiani de La Porta
 Alexander Karađorđević
 Willy Coppens
 Isma'il Pasha
 Mihailo Obrenović
 Frits Thaulow
 Lazar Arsenijević Batalaka
 Ilija Garašanin

References

Glory
1831 establishments in the Ottoman Empire
Awards established in 1831
Military awards and decorations of the Ottoman Empire